1	Hermon
9,232 feet
2	Wadi Hajar
8,537 feet
3	Chaghour ed Dahab
8,400 feet
4	Tal'at Musa
8,208 feet
5	Jabal Abu Baruh
8,170 feet
6	Jabal al Ithnayn
7,898 feet
7	Qornet el Boustane
7,780 feet
8	Jabal Halimah
7,766 feet
9	Ar Rajur
7,745 feet
10	Shaqif
7,732 fee

Aleppo
Mount Barṣa
Mount Ḥaṣṣ
Mount Kurd
Mount Simeon

Al-Hasakah
Mount Abdulaziz
Sinjar Mountains (the western part of the mountain range)

Deir ez-Zor
 Jebel Bishri
 Jabal Turdah (alternatively, Turdah mountains)

Idlib
Mount Ḥārim
Mount Zāwiya

Latakia
Mount Alawites
Mount Aqraʻ
Turkmen Mountain

Rif Dimashq
Anti-Lebanon Mountains
Mount Qasioun

Qunaytira
Mount Hermon
Mountains in the Golan Heights

Suwayda
Mount Druze

Hama
Jabal al-Fawwar
Jabal al-Kana'is
Jabal Kafraa
Jabal Sha'ir
Jabal Zayn al-Abidin
Kafraa
Maarin al-Jabal
Zayn al-Abidin

Syria
Mountains
Syria